Val de Drôme (literally Vale of Drôme) is a commune in the department of Calvados, northwestern France. The municipality was established on 1 January 2017 by merger of the former communes of Sept-Vents (the seat), Dampierre, La Lande-sur-Drôme and Saint-Jean-des-Essartiers.

See also 
Communes of the Calvados department

References 

Communes of Calvados (department)
Populated places established in 2017
2017 establishments in France